Richard O'Donovan II, The O'Donovan of Clancahill, (1764/1768—1829), Lieutenant General    was the son of Jane Becher, daughter of John Becher, and Daniel V O'Donovan, The O'Donovan of Clancahill.

O'Donovan fought with the 6th Dragoons in the Napoleonic Wars, in the Flanders Campaign and in Spain, and became an intimate acquaintance of the English Prince Regent, and once saved the life of the Prince Frederick, Duke of York and Albany during the retreat of the English Army from Holland. In 1800 he gained the rank of Lieutenant Colonel of the 6th Dragoons.

O'Donovan held the Chiefship of Clancahill in 1778. He married a Welsh lady, Emma Anne Powell, daughter of Robert Powell, but they were without issue. Richard O'Donovan then overturned his father's will and left his entire estates, including the Manor of Bawnlahan, to her family, to the immense displeasure of his own, it being the very last of the O'Donovan family's by that time 600-year-old estates in Carbery still in existence. He died in 1829. The Chiefship of Clancahill then passed to the cadet line, descendants of Teige, younger brother of Donal III O'Donovan.

Notes

References

 Burke, Bernard and Hugh Montgomery-Massingberd, Burke's Irish Family Records. London: Burke's Peerage Ltd. 5th edition, 1976.
 Burke, Bernard and Ashworth Peter Burke, A Genealogical and Heraldic History of the Landed Gentry of Ireland. London: Harrison & Sons. 9th edition, 1899. pp. 341–2
 Cannon, Richard, Historical Record of the Life Guards. 1837.
 Sir Richard Cox, 1st Baronet, Carberiae Notitia. 1686. extracts published in Journal of the Cork Historical and Archaeological Society, Volume XII, Second Series. 1906. pp. 142–9
 O'Donovan, John (ed. & tr.), Annala Rioghachta Eireann. Annals of the Kingdom of Ireland by the Four Masters, from the Earliest Period to 1616. 7 vols. Dublin: Royal Irish Academy. 1848–51. 2nd edition, 1856. Volume VI, pp. 2459–60
 O'Hart, John, Irish Pedigrees. Dublin: James Duffy and Co. 5th edition, 1892. p. 201
 Ó Murchadha, Diarmuid, "Diary of General Richard O'Donovan 1819–1823", in Journal of the Cork Historical and Archaeological Society 91, No. 250. 1986. pp. 105–17.
 Society for Army Historical Research, Journal of the Society for Army Historical Research 1948. London.

People from County Cork
Richard
1829 deaths
6th (Inniskilling) Dragoons officers
Year of birth unknown